Mike Miles served as the superintendent of the Dallas Independent School District (DISD) from July 1, 2012 to June 25, 2015, and previously in Colorado Springs, Colorado.

Miles once served as a ranger in the United States Army. In his educational career he served as a superintendent for Harrison School District 2 in Colorado Springs, Colorado. Miles operated an educational consulting firm called Focal Point while in that position. The business wound down after he became DISD superintendent as his contract for DISD had restrictions on his outside activities. In Colorado Springs he tied pay advances to gains in student scores.

Dallas Independent School District
Miles created the reform effort Destination 2020 which asked for improvements to be made by 2013 and 2015. Another plan, Accelerating Campus Excellence" (ACE) involved moving new principals and teachers into campuses and attracting high-performing teachers to needy campuses.

Dallas County Commissioner John Wiley Price criticized Miles and called for his ouster.

In 2013 there was a vote held by the school board on whether to remove Miles from his position. Five members voted against and three voted for. Miles' family initially moved from Colorado Springs to Dallas, but they returned to Colorado Springs in 2013 as a result of media attention on Miles' career.

In 2014 Miles expressed a desire to get additional compensation in his contract. Miles attempted to get amendments to his Dallas ISD contract but the board did not approve them. Miles stated in June 2015 that he was going to resign.

Post-Dallas ISD
After his resignation from Dallas ISD he established a new consulting firm, Third Future.

References

External links
 
 

Living people

School superintendents in Colorado

Dallas Independent School District superintendents
Year of birth missing (living people)